A list of films produced in Egypt in 1997. For an A-Z list of films currently on Wikipedia, see :Category:Egyptian films.

External links
 Egyptian films of 1997 at the Internet Movie Database
 Egyptian films of 1997 elCinema.com

Lists of Egyptian films by year
1997 in Egypt
Lists of 1997 films by country or language